The viscounts of Béarn (Basque: Bearno, Gascon: Bearn or Biarn) were the rulers of the viscounty of Béarn, located in the Pyrenees mountains and in the plain at their feet, in southwest France. Along with the three Basque provinces of Soule, Lower Navarre, and Labourd, as well as small parts of Gascony, it forms the current département of Pyrénées-Atlantiques (64).

Béarn is bordered by Basque provinces Soule and Lower Navarre to the west, by Gascony (Landes and Armagnac) to the north, by Bigorre to the east, and by Spain (Aragon) to the south.

List of Viscounts of Béarn

House of Gascony

Until 1251, probably all counts of Gascony descended from the House Gascony, head of the Duchy of Gascony.

House of Montcada
 1170–1173 : 16th William I (married to Mary) 
 1173–1215 : 17th Gaston VI the Good (son)
 1215–1223 : 18th William Raymond (brother of previous)
 1223–1229 : 19th William II (son)
 1229–1290 : 20th Gaston VII the Great (son)
 1290–1319 : 21st Margaret (daughter of, married Roger-Bernard III of Foix)

House of Foix

Béarn line

 1302–1315 : 22nd Gaston VIII (son of, also count of Foix)
 1315–1343 : 23rd Gaston IX (son of, also count of Foix)
 1343–1391 : 24th Gaston X Phoebus (son of, also count of Foix)
 1391–1398 : 25th Matthew (son of Roger Bernard II, viscount of Castelbon, who was son of Roger Bernard I, viscount of Castelbon, who was younger brother of Gaston II of Foix-Béarn, also count of Foix and viscount of Castelbon)
 1398–1428 : 26th Isabelle (sister of, also countess of Foix and viscountess of Castelbon, married Archambaud of Grailly)

Grailly line

 1412–1436 : 27th John I (son of, also count of Foix, viscount of Villemur and count of Bigorre)
 1436–1472 : 28th Gaston XI (son of, also count of Foix, viscount of Nébouzan and count of Bigorre, married Eleanor of Navarre, queen of Navarre) (References to "Gaston of Bearn" in history texts often refer to him)
 1479–1483 : 29th Francis Phoebus (son of Gaston of Foix, prince of Viane, also king of Navarre, count of Bigorre, count of Foix))
 1483–1517 : 30th Catherine (sister of, also queen of Navarre, countess of Bigorre, countess of Foix), married John of Albret, king of Navarre

In 1512 Ferdinand II of Aragon conquered the better part of the kingdom of Navarre, leaving the kingdom with only the small section it held north of the Pyrenees.

House of Albret

 1517–1555 : 31st Henry I (son of, also king of Navarre, count of Foix, duke of Albret, count of Bigorre)
 1555–1572 : 32nd Joan (daughter of, queen of Navarre, countess of Foix, duchess of Albret, countess of Bigorre, married Anthony of Bourbon)

House of Bourbon

 1572–1607 : 33rd Henry II (son of, also king of France, king of Navarre, duke of Bourbon, duke of Vendôme, count of Bigorre, count of Foix)

In 1620 the viscountcy of Béarn was reunited to the French crown, whereas Lower Navarre was in 1607.

References

External links

See also
 Fors de Béarn

 
Béarn